Sylvia Plischke (Czech: Plischkeová, born 20 July 1977) is a former professional tennis player from the Czech Republic, representing Austria. Her career-high singles ranking was No. 27 in the world, achieved in 1999.

Biography
Sylvia Plischke was born in Plzeň, Czechoslovakia, to Lubomír Plischke and Alena Plischkeová. The family moved to Austria when Sylvia was six years old and Sylvia went on to represent Austria in the Fed Cup and the Olympic Games. Her mother also was an Olympian, having represented Czechoslovakia in the 1972 Summer Olympics in the high jump.

WTA Tour finals

Doubles: 1 (title)

ITF finals

Singles (2–1)

Doubles (2–3)

External links
 
 
 

1977 births
Living people
Austrian female tennis players
Olympic tennis players of Austria
Sportspeople from Plzeň
Sportspeople from Innsbruck
Tennis players at the 2000 Summer Olympics
Czech emigrants to Austria